The Old Hezarjarib District Was a district (bakhsh) in Behshahr County, Mazandaran Province, Iran. 

Old Hezarjarib and Astarabad was a place that Sardar Rafie Yanehsari’s dynasty was the local governing of there. 
He was one of the four persons who called himself a king and increased his power and influence as he made the Constitution governments worried.

Behshahr County
Districts of Mazandaran Province